Dendryphantes rafalskii is a jumping spider in the genus Dendryphantes that lives in South Africa and Zimbabwe. The species was first described by Wanda Wesołowska in 2000.

References

Spiders described in 2000
Arthropods of Zimbabwe
Salticidae
Spiders of Africa
Spiders of South Africa
Taxa named by Wanda Wesołowska